Roy Feinson is a South African born software engineer, author, and artist who patented the first fully functional predictive text system that included disambiguation and local dictionary storage.

Founder and President of EmergeX.AI,  Doubletake Images LLC, and Orb Reality LLC; D.C. based software firms, Feinson holds a number of computer-technology patents and his scientific applications deal with artificial life, artificial intelligence and forensic image analysis and his model of animal vision was recently presented to scientists at N.I.S.T.  One of the original pioneers in the field of photographic mosaics, he is credited for creating the genre known as impressionist mosaics in which the imperfections of natural materials such as turquoise or marble are organized to create ethereal imagery.

Feinson is the author of three books focused on the evolutionary underpinnings of human behavior. His books have been translated into ten different languages including Mandarin, Japanese, Czech, Hebrew and French, and has been featured on CNN, The Dr. Phil Show and CBS The Talk

His novel theory of animal vision, The Zebra's Stripes, was presented to scientists at the National Institute for Standards and Technology in 2013 and addresses many unanswered questions in the field of animal behavior and camouflage.

Installations and awards

2000:  Winner of C-Span Presidential Art Contest. 

In 2006, Feinson was the featured artist for Disneyland's 49th Anniversary, where he created the largest photographic mosaic ever made, spanning over 10,000 square feet and featuring live performers carrying photographs of themselves and other cast members.

In 2007, Feinson was commissioned to create a series of 38 large-scale mosaic works for Disney's 50th anniversary's celebration, the Happiest Homecoming on Earth. A special feature, installed near the park's town hall, was the world's first tri-level mosaic; a giant mosaic of Mickey Mouse in Steamboat Willie made up of 1,000 portraits of Disney cast members, which in turn were mosaics composed of 600,000 photographs submitted by park guests.

In 2008, Feinson was selected as the featured artist for the Grammy Awards 50th anniversary. The artwork was unveiled by Quincy Jones, Joss Stone and Recording Academy President Neil Portnow who called Feinson "a true artistic innovator, and.. renaissance man". The Grammy artwork is part of the permanent collection at the Grammy museum in Los Angeles.

2009:  Winner New York Times original science riddle. 

In 2014, Feinson was selected as the official artist for the 15th anniversary of the Latin Grammys.

Other installations
Honolulu International Airport 
Martin Luther King District 
Pentagon. Operation Grateful Nation 
Detroit Zoo 
Lurie Children's Hospital Chicago 
Detroit Children's Hospital

Bibliography
The Animal in You.(St. Martins Press)1998
Das Tier in dir. (Broschiert)1999
Animal Attraction. (St. Martins Press)1999
The Secret Universe of Names (Overlook/Penguin)2004

Patents
Interpretive tone telecommunication method and apparatus. Status: Granted. Patent Number US4754474A 
System and Method for Facilitating Affective-State-Based Artificial Intelligence. Publication Number: 20190236464. Status: Pending. 
Surround video playback: Status: Granted.  Patent number: 8867886 
Surround Video Recording: Publication number: 20120307068. Status: Granted.
Methods and Systems for Navigating Autonomous and Semi-Autonomous Vehicles. U.S. patent application 16/584566
Antibodies Directed to Filamin-A and Therapeutic Uses Thereof  U.S. Publication WO/2020/076954

See also
Impressionist mosaics
Photographic mosaic
Animal in You
Happiest Homecoming on Earth

References

External links
 

South African artists
Year of birth missing (living people)
Living people